The Heinkel HD 44 was a special-purpose light transport aircraft developed in Germany in the 1920s.

Design and development
The Heinkel HD 44 was similar in layout to the Heinkel HD 40, but differed in the design of the tail assembly. The crew were situated in an open cabin with twin controls, while the passengers were in a closed cabin.

The HD 44 first flew in 1929, but the idea of a transport plane was abandoned by the DVL and the aircraft relegated to being an engine-testbed.

Specifications (HD 44)

References

1920s German cargo aircraft
HD 44
Biplanes
Aircraft first flown in 1929